Sheika may refer to:

 Sheikha, a Sheikh's wife or daughter
 Omar Sheika (born 1977), American super middleweight boxer
 Sheika River, a river in North Russia

See also
 Sheikah, a fictional race of ninja-like warriors in The Legend of Zelda